Political Agent or political agent may refer to:

Political Resident, a representative with consular duties and political contacts with local chiefs
Political officer (British Empire), an officer of the British imperial civil administration, also called Political Agent
Election agent, a person legally responsible for the conduct of a candidate's political campaign
Political agents are nowadays part of civil service of Pakistan of grade 18 or 19